Antillostenochrus is a genus of hubbardiid short-tailed whipscorpions, first described by Armas & Teruel in 2002.

Species 
, the World Schizomida Catalog accepts the following thirteen species:

 Antillostenochrus alejandroi (Armas, 1989) – Cuba
 Antillostenochrus alticola Teruel, 2003 – Cuba
 Antillostenochrus anseli Teruel, 2015 – Cuba
 Antillostenochrus brevipatellatus (Rowland & Reddell, 1979) – Haiti
 Antillostenochrus cerdoso (Camilo & Cokendolpher, 1988) – Puerto Rico
 Antillostenochrus cokendolpheri Armas & Teruel, 2002 – Cuba
 Antillostenochrus eremita Teruel & Rodríguez-Cabrera, 2019 – Cuba
 Antillostenochrus gibarensis Armas & Teruel, 2002 – Cuba
 Antillostenochrus holguin Armas & Teruel, 2002 – Cuba
 Antillostenochrus longior Teruel, 2013 – Cuba
 Antillostenochrus planicauda Teruel, 2003 – Cuba
 Antillostenochrus subcerdoso (Armas & Abud Antun, 1990) – Dominican Republic
 †Antillostenochrus pseudoannulatus (Krüger & Dunlop, 2010) – Dominican Republic (Miocene Amber)

References 

Schizomida genera